Epsilon 15 (or ε15) is a virus, specifically a bacteriophage, known to infect species of  Salmonella bacteria including Salmonella anatum.The virus is a short, tailed phage with a double-stranded DNA genome of 39,671 base pairs and 49 open reading frames.

References

Podoviridae